Holmström is a Swedish-language surname.

Geographical distribution
As of 2014, 71.5% of all known bearers of the surname Holmström were residents of Sweden (frequency 1:1,444) and 26.7% of Finland (1:2,162).

In Sweden, the frequency of the surname was higher than national average (1:1,444) in the following counties:
 1. Västerbotten County (1:321)
 2. Norrbotten County (1:534)
 3. Västmanland County (1:1,179)
 4. Blekinge County (1:1,184)
 5. Gävleborg County (1:1,327)
 6. Dalarna County (1:1,333)
 7. Västernorrland County (1:1,333)
 8. Stockholm County (1:1,402)

In Finland, the frequency of the surname was higher than national average (1:2,162) in the following regions:
 1. Åland (1:139)
 2. Ostrobothnia (1:960)
 3. Uusimaa (1:1,110)
 4. Southwest Finland (1:1,643)

People
Agne Holmström (1893–1949), Swedish athlete who mainly competed in the 100 metres
August Wilhelm Holmström, Finnish and Russian silversmith and goldsmith
Axel Holmström (1881–1947), Swedish anarchist
Ben Holmstrom (born 1987), American professional ice hockey center
Bengt R. Holmström (born 1949), the Paul A. Samuelson Professor of Economics at M.I.T. and Nobel Prize winner
Bodil Holmström, Finnish orienteering competitor
Buzz Holmstrom (1909–1946), pioneer of running the Colorado River through the Grand Canyon
Carita Holmström (born 1954), Finnish pianist, singer and songwriter
John Holmstrom, American underground cartoonist and writer
Karl Holmström (1925–1974), Swedish ski jumper who competed in the 1950s
Kjell Holmström (1916–1999), Swedish bobsledder who competed in the 1950s and in the 1960s
Lakshmi Holmström, writer, literary critic and translator of Tamil fiction into English
Peter Holmström, American rock musician
Rick Holmstrom (born 1965), American blues guitarist, singer and songwriter
Simon Holmström (born 2001), Swedish ice hockey player
Susanne Holmström (born 1947), Danish sociologist, best known for her writings on organizational legitimacy
Tomas Holmström (born 1973), Swedish professional ice hockey left winger
Tora Vega Holmström (1880–1967), Swedish painter

See also
Holmström's theorem, impossibility theorem attributed to Bengt R. Holmström

References

Swedish-language surnames